General Sumner may refer to:

Edwin Vose Sumner (1797–1863), Union Army major general 
Edwin Vose Sumner Jr. (1835–1912), U.S. Army brevet brigadier general
Jethro Sumner (c. 1733–1785), North Carolina Militia brigadier general in the American Revolutionary War
Samuel S. Sumner (1842–1937), U.S. Army major general
William H. Sumner (1780–1861), Massachusetts Militia general

See also
Owen Summers Jr. (1890–1971), U.S Army brigadier general